Sri Vadaranyeswarar Temple, built by the Cholas during the 12th century CE, is regarded as a sacred Shaivaite temple in that it is one of the 5 majestic cosmic dance halls (pancha sabhai) of Lord Shiva, known as "Ratna Sabai".This temple is well known for its carvings depicting the phases of fetus development, hundreds of years before the invention of the microscope.

Sri Tazuvikuzandheswarar Temple is another big temple located about two kilometer far south-easterly to Vadaranyeswarar Temple.

Speciality
It is one of the shrines of the 275 Paadal Petra Sthalams.

Legend
Two demons Sumba and Nisumba chose this banyan jungle for their stay and began harassing the Devas. They appealed to Mother Parvathi for protection. Mother Parvathi created a furious Kali and destroyed the demons. Kali consumed the blood of the demons and their army and grew more furious.

At the request of Sage Munjikesa Karkodaka, Lord Shiva reached the place. Kali challenged the Lord for a dance and said that she would give her right in the place to the Lord if He won. The dance began. Lord dropped His ear ring on the ground, picked it by the toe of His left leg and fixed it back on His ear in the dance. Kali accepted her defeat and said that she could not do such a marvelous dance. Lord Shiva said that He alone was equal to Her and said further that those coming to worship Him here, should worship Her first to reap the full benefit of the worship. Since then, Kali has Her own temple to grace the devotees.

It is in this temple that Lord addressed the Great Shiva devotee Karaikkal Ammeiyar as "Ammaye". Ammeiyar enjoyed the dance performance of the Lord standing upside down. Ammeiyar reached this temple by head as she thought walking by feet to Lords shrine was a sin. She reached the state of bliss here.

Pancha Sabhai Sthalangal 
The temples where Shiva is believed to have performed the Cosmic Dance.

External links
 Sri Vadaranyeswarar temple - Dinamalar Temple Information

Hindu temples in Tiruvallur district
Padal Petra Stalam
Pancha Sabhai
Shiva temples in Tiruvallur district